His Dark Materials is a play written by British playwright Nicholas Wright, adapted from the Philip Pullman fantasy novel trilogy of the same title. The production premiered in the Royal National Theatre's Olivier Theatre, London, in 2003. Due to the complications in staging a piece containing the narrative of three books, the play was performed in two parts in alternate performances. The play is published by Nick Hern Books.

Synopsis
The play follows the same plot as the books – a story of the coming of age of two children, Will Parry and Lyra Belacqua, and their adventures as they wander through a series of parallel universes against a backdrop of epic events. During their quest, the pair encounter various fantasy creatures such as witches and armoured polar bears in a journey which they hope will take them to The Republic of Heaven.

There are however some substantial differences, most notably the removal of the character Dr. Mary Malone, whose role in the story is turned over to the witch Serafina Pekala. Similarly the eponymous amber spyglass of the third novel, associated with Malone, is also largely absent.

Productions

Original production
The original production was staged at the Olivier Theatre, National Theatre and ran from 20 December 2003 until 27 March 2004. The production was directed by Nicholas Hytner and featured the following cast:
Pantalaimon – Samuel Barnett
Lord Boreal – John Carlisle
Will Parry – Dominic Cooper
Serafina Pekkala – Niamh Cusack
Lord Asriel – Timothy Dalton
Farder Coram – Patrick Godfrey
John Faa – Stephen Greif
Billy Costa – Jamie Harding
Mrs Coulter – Patricia Hodge
Dr Cade – Akbar Kurtha
Jopari/Iofur Raknison – Chris Larkin
Tortured Witch/Harpy – Inika Leigh Wright
Salcilia – Helena Lymbery
Fra Pavel/Lee Scoresby – Tim McMullan
Professor Hopcraft – Iain Mitchell
Lyra Belacqua – Anna Maxwell Martin
Macaw Lady – Helen Murton
Stelmaria – Emily Mytton
Ruta Skadi – Cecilia Noble
Mrs Lonsdale – Katy Odey
Thorold – Nick Sampson
Iorek Byrnison – Dany Sapani
Ben – Jason Thorpe
Roger Parslow – Russell Tovey
Perkins – Daniel Tuite
Astronomy Scholar/Dr West – Andrew Westfield
Brother Jasper – Ben Whishaw
Angelica – Katie Wimpenny
Golden Monkey – Ben Wright
Tony Costa – Richard Youman

All other parts were played by members of the company.

The technical crew were as follows:
Set Designer – Giles Cadle
Costume Designer – Jon Morrell
Puppet Designer – Michael Curry
Lighting Designer – Paule Constable
Video Projection Designer – Thomas Gray for The Gray Circle
Computer Graphics Designer – Yuri Tanaka for The Gray Circle
Choreographer/Associate Director – Aletta Collins
Music Composer – Jonathan Dove
Music Director – Steve Edis
Fight Director – Terry King
Sound Designer – Paul Groothuis

2004 revival
The production was revived, again at the Olivier, National Theatre, in 2004. It opened on 20 November 2004 and ran until 2 April 2005. The production was again directed by Nicholas Hytner with Matt Wilde and featured the following cast:
Serafina Pekkala – Adjoa Andoh
Billy Costa – Mark Buchner
Lord Boreal – John Carlisle
Jessie – Michelle Dockery
Mrs Lonsdale – Vanessa Earl
Pantalaimon – Jamie Harding
Roger Parslow – Darren Hart
Iofur Raknison/Jeptha Jones – Don Gallagher
John Faa – Ian Gelder
Lord Asriel – David Harewood
Golden Monkey – Leo Kay
Farder Coram – David Killick
Ben – Pascal Langdale
Lilly – Samantha Lawson
Brother Jasper/Kaisa – Elliot Levey
Will Parry – Michael Legge
Stelmaria – Emma Manton
Mrs Coulter – Lesley Manville
Professor Hopcraft – Iain Mitchell
Salcilia – Victoria Moseley
Daisy – Helen Murton
Dr Cade – Chiké Okonkwo
Tony Costa – Harry Peacock
Lee Scoresby – Alan Perrin
Iorek Byrnison – Alistair Petrie
Dr West – Dodger Phillips
Thorold/Balthamos – Samuel Roukin
Fra Pavel – Nick Sampson
Ruta Skadi/Betty – Rachel Sanders
Lyra Belacqua – Elaine Symons

The technical crew remained largely the same as the original production with only the following changes/additions:
Associate Lighting Designer – Vic Smerdon
Music Director – Mark Bousie
In 2009 the Birmingham Repertory Theatre presented a new production directed by Rachel Kavanaugh before transferring to the West Yorkshire Playhouse and touring the UK.

Awards and nominations
The production won two Laurence Olivier Awards in 2005 for Best Set Design for Giles Cadle and Best Lighting Design for Paule Constable.

See also
His Dark Materials
The Golden Compass (film)

References

External links
His Dark Materials (Part 1) on the National Theatre website
His Dark Materials (Part 2) on the National Theatre website

2003 plays
Plays by Nicholas Wright
Plays based on novels
His Dark Materials